The season began on 20 August 2011 and ended on 9 June 2012.
Ljubljana and Portorož Piran were excluded after the 2010–11 season, their places were taken by Zagorje and Izola.

Clubs East

League standing

Clubs West

1 Korte and Bravo declined promotion.

League standing

See also
2011–12 Slovenian Second League

External links
Football Association of Slovenia 
MNZ Ptuj 
MNZ Koper 

3
Slovenian Third League, 2011-12
Slovenian Third League seasons